Aliabad (also Romanized as ‘Alīābād) is a village in Hoseynabad Rural District, Mehrdasht District, Najafabad County, Isfahan Province, Iran. At the 2006 census, its population was 363, in 100 families.

References 

Populated places in Najafabad County